Akitake (written: 秋武, 昭武 or 明丈) is a masculine Japanese given name. Notable people with the name include:

, Japanese actor
, Japanese baseball player
, Japanese daimyō

Japanese masculine given names